An arşın ( or ) is an old Turkish unit of length, about  long.

The word means 'arm' and thus the measure corresponds to a yard.

See also
 arş, the Ottoman cubit

Notes

Obsolete units of measurement
Units of length
Ottoman units of measurement